B-Sides is an iTunes-exclusive album from the Coventry Trio The Enemy, consisting of ten songs that were B-sides to the single releases from their debut album We'll Live and Die in These Towns.

Track list

Fear Killed the Youth of Our Nation
Get Blown Away (Cover of Ocean Colour Scene)
Waste Your Life Away (B-Side to It's Not OK)
Let Me Know
Happy Birthday Jane
Five Years ( David Bowie Cover )
Away From Here (Radio 1 Live Lounge)
Ordinary Girl
You're Not Alone (Neoteric Remix)
Message to You Rudy (Feat. Neville from the Specials, From 7" Vinyl of Away From Here)

External links
The Enemy – News

The Enemy (UK rock band) albums
ITunes-exclusive releases
2008 compilation albums
B-side compilation albums